The Department of Communications and Digital Technologies (formerly the Department of Telecommunications and Postal Services and the Department of Communications) is one of the departments of the South African government. It is responsible for overseeing the South African communications, telecommunications and broadcasting industries. The political head of the department is the Minister of Communications and Digital Technologies, who is assisted by a deputy minister.  the minister is Khumbudzo Ntshavheni and her deputy is Philly Mapulane.

In 2014 President Jacob Zuma renamed the original Department of Communications to the Department of Telecommunications and Postal Services, at the same time creating a new Department of Communications with different responsibilities, including propaganda. In June 2019 President Cyril Ramaphosa announced that the two departments would be merged to create the Department of Communications and Digital Technologies.

Ministers through the years

Portfolio organisations
Portfolio organisations are those public enterprises (i.e. parastatals) that report to the South African Government via the Ministry of Communications. These are:

 
 Independent Communications Authority of South Africa
 South African Post Office
 Sentech
 .za Domain Name Authority (.ZADNA)
 National Electronic Media Institute of South Africa
 Universal Service and Access Agency of South Africa
 e-Skills Institute

References

External links
 Department of Communications
 ZADNA

Communications
Communications in South Africa
South Africa